Garfield is a city in Emanuel County, Georgia, United States. The population was 201 at the 2010 census, up from 152 in 2000.

History
The Georgia General Assembly incorporated the place as the Town of Garfield in 1905.

Geography

Garfield is located in eastern Emanuel County at  (32.650511, -82.096319). Georgia State Route 23 passes through the city, leading northeast  to Millen and southwest  to Twin City.

Demographics

As of the census of 2000, there were 152 people, 65 households, and 46 families residing in the town. The racial makeup of the town was 75.66% White and 24.34% African American.

There were 65 households, out of which 33.8% had children under the age of 18 living with them, 44.6% were married couples living together, 23.1% had a female householder with no husband present, and 29.2% were non-families. 26.2% of all households were made up of individuals, and 12.3% had someone living alone who was 65 years of age or older. The average household size was 2.34 and the average family size was 2.80.

In the town the population was spread out, with 30.9% under the age of 18, 9.2% from 18 to 24, 19.7% from 25 to 44, 20.4% from 45 to 64, and 19.7% who were 65 years of age or older. The median age was 36 years. For every 100 females, there were 65.2 males. For every 100 females age 18 and over, there were 66.7 males.

The median income for a household in the town was $14,167, and the median income for a family was $22,500. Males had a median income of $36,875 versus $17,500 for females. The per capita income for the town was $16,038. About 27.1% of families and 36.4% of the population were below the poverty line, including 56.0% of those under the age of eighteen and 9.4% of those 65 or over.

References

Cities in Emanuel County, Georgia
Cities in Georgia (U.S. state)